Kevin Lamont Thompson (born February 7, 1971) is an American former professional basketball player.

Thompson, a 6'11" center played one NBA season for the Portland Trail Blazers before continuing his career in Europe.

College career
Thompson played college basketball for the NC State Wolfpack in the Atlantic Coast Conference of the NCAA Division I from 1989 to 1993.

Professional career
He was 48th overall in the second round of the 1993 NBA Draft by the Portland Trail Blazers. Signed by the Trail Blazers, he played one season in the NBA, averaging 0.9 points and 0.9 rebounds in 14 games.

Released by the Trail Blazers, he moved to the Italian Serie A, playing successively for Illycaffe Trieste, Scavolini Pesaro - with whom he led the league in rebounding in 1996–97, Viola Reggio Calabria and Lineltex Imola.

He also played in the United States Basketball League and the Turkish Basketball League, later finishing his career in the Spanish Liga ACB.

External links
NBA profile  Retrieved on 10 June 2015
Lega Basket Serie A profile Retrieved on 10 June 2015 
Liga ACB profile Retrieved on 10 June 2015 
TBLStat.net Profile
RealGM profile Retrieved on 10 June 2015

1971 births
Living people
American expatriate basketball people in Italy
American expatriate basketball people in Spain
American expatriate basketball people in Turkey
American men's basketball players
Andrea Costa Imola players
Baloncesto León players
Basketball players from Winston-Salem, North Carolina
Beşiktaş men's basketball players
CB Girona players
CB Murcia players
CB Valladolid players
Centers (basketball)
Lega Basket Serie A players
Liga ACB players
NC State Wolfpack men's basketball players
Oyak Renault basketball players
Pallacanestro Trieste players
Portland Trail Blazers draft picks
Portland Trail Blazers players
Victoria Libertas Pallacanestro players
Viola Reggio Calabria players